"Roman" is the first mini album by the South Korean boy band Teen Top. It was released on July 26, 2011 with the song "No More Perfume on You" as the title track.

History
Teen Top worked with producer Bang Si Hyuk and composer Park Chang Hyeon (whose hits include TVXQ's Hug and Fly to the Sky's Missing You) to create a musically diverse mini-album. The album's title song "No More Perfume on You" used for promotions, is a stylish dance number that stands out with its sophisticated melody and harmonization.

Track listing

Charts

Album chart

Single chart

Sales and certifications

References

External links
 Official Website

2011 EPs
Teen Top EPs